Juan Danilo Santacruz González (born 12 June 1995) is a Paraguayan footballer who plays for Paraguayan Primera División club Nacional.

Club career

Early career / Libertad
Santacruz was born in the city of Caaguazú. He started his professional career with Libertad at the age of 19. He made his debut for the club against General Díaz in the league first division on 11 August 2014. On 20 October 2014, Santacruz scored his first goal as a professional, with scored 2 goals in a 6–0 home win against General Díaz. He has made 88 league appearances in total, scoring 10 goals with the club.

Nacional

On 1 July 2018, Santacruz moved to Nacional on loan from Libertad. He made his debut for the club on 18 July 2018, playing full 90-minutes in a 1–2 home loss against Olimpia. Later, he signed permanently with the club.

International career
Santacruz was summoned for Paraguay national under-20 team to play 2015 South American Youth Football Championship.

Career statistics

Club

References

External links
 at Fichajes.com

1995 births
Living people
Paraguayan footballers
Paraguay under-20 international footballers
Paraguayan Primera División players
Club Libertad footballers
Club Nacional footballers
2015 South American Youth Football Championship players

Association football wingers